The following lists events that have happened in 1909 in the Qajar dynasty, Iran.

Incumbents
 Monarch: Mohammad Ali Shah Qajar (until July 16), Ahmad Shah Qajar (starting July 16)
 Prime Minister: 
 until April 29: Ahmad Moshir al-Saltaneh
 April 29-May 2: Kamran Mirza Nayeb al-Saltaneh
 May 2-May 8: vacant
 May 8-July 13: Javad Sa'd al-Dowleh
 July 17-September 30: vacant
 starting September 30: Mohammad Vali Khan Tonekaboni

Events
 January 23 – The 7.3  Borujerd earthquake affected central Iran with a maximum Mercalli intensity of IX (Violent), killing between 6,000–8000.
 July 16 – Ahmad Shah Qajar, the last king of Qajar dynasty, ascended to throne.

References

 
Iran
Years of the 20th century in Iran
1900s in Iran
Iran